Goyazan may refer to:

 Mount Goyazan
 Göyazan Qazakh FK